Billbrook is a quarter of Hamburg, Germany, in the borough of Hamburg-Mitte. It is located on the southeastern border of the borough adjacent to the borough of Bergedorf. Billbrook is located in a swamp area near the Elbe and Bille rivers, which is described by the name, meaning Brook (Bruchwald, carr) at the river Bille. 2,198 people lived in Billbrook in 2016.

Billbrook borders the quarters of Horn, Billstedt, Billwerder, Moorfleet and Rothenburgsort.

History 
On the end of the 19th century the area was raised with sand in order to facilitate the construction of buildings. The area was accessed planfully by a network of long, straight streets, which is uncharacteristic for Hamburg. Five wide channels (Tiefstack- and Billbrookkanal, Tidekanal, Industriekanal and Moorfleeter Kanal) are used for drainage and are also navigable by ships with shallow draft.

Today, Billbrook is largely an industrial area, the second largest in Hamburg. There are only two small residential areas. The Tiefstack power plant is also located here. It was built from 1914 to 1917.

Politics
These are the results of Billbrook in the Hamburg state election:

References

External links

 Billbrook, Hamburg.de

Quarters of Hamburg
Hamburg-Mitte